Treble & Reverb is the third studio album by New Zealand recording artist Aaradhna, released on 9 November 2012. A deluxe edition was released on 22 October 2013 with an extra disc of songs.

Composition
The album contains doo-wop and 1960s pop music influences.

Release and reception
Treble & Reverb was released in New Zealand by Dawn Raid Entertainment on 9 November 2012. Lydia Jenken of The New Zealand Herald gave the album three and a half stars out of five, and wrote that it is too long and repetitive.
Treble & Reverb entered the New Zealand Albums Chart at its peak position of number fourteen, and spent a total of eighteen weeks on the chart.

Accolades
The album received several nominations at the 2013 New Zealand Music Awards and won Album of the Year, Best Urban/Hip Hop Album, Best Pacific Music Album and Best Female Solo Artist.

Track listing

References

External links

Aaradhna albums
2012 albums